Wayne Maxim Thring (born 1 February 1963) is a South African teacher and politician who serves as the deputy president of the African Christian Democratic Party (ACDP). He was sworn in as a Member of the National Assembly of South Africa in May 2019. Thring had previously served as an MP in the same house in 2013.

Biography
Thring was born on 1 February 1963. He obtained a teaching diploma from the Bechet Teachers’ Training College. He later achieved both a BA degree in psychology and biblical studies and a BA Honours in psychology from the University of South Africa. Thring received a postgraduate diploma in economic principles from the University of London.

Thring joined the ACDP in 1995. He was elected the deputy provincial chairperson of the party in KwaZulu-Natal prior to being elected provincial chairperson in 1997. He held the post for a decade. Thring is currently the ACDP's national deputy president and the provincial leader of the party. In 2000, he was elected as a city councillor in the eThekwini Metropolitan Municipality. He served on the council until 2013.

Thring was sworn in as an MP on 21 June 2013 but only held the post for five months before resigning on 21 November 2013. However, he returned to Parliament following the 2019 general election.

References

External links
Mr Wayne Maxim Thring – People's Assembly

Living people
1963 births
Coloured South African people
People from Durban
People from KwaZulu-Natal
African Christian Democratic Party politicians
Members of the National Assembly of South Africa
Alumni of the University of London
University of South Africa alumni